Camellia railway station, originally Subiaco railway station, was a railway station in Sydney, Australia, that was open between 1885 and 2020. It was located on the Carlingford line, serving the suburb of Camellia and at the time of closure was served by Sydney Trains T6 Carlingford line services.

History
Camellia station opened on 21 January 1885 as Subiaco. It was renamed Camellia on 14 September 1901.

In 2014, Camellia was the least patronised station on the Sydney Trains network, with 70 boardings per day being recorded.

The Camellia to Carlingford section of the Carlingford railway line is being converted to light rail as part of the Parramatta Light Rail project with the line closed on 5 January 2020. The area near Camellia station will be the branching point for the lines to Carlingford and Strathfield.

The station and surrounding area were fully demolished in May 2020.

Platforms & former services
At the time the station closed the platform had the following services:

Transport links
Camellia station was served by one NightRide route:
N61: Carlingford station to Town Hall station

References

External links

Camellia station details Transport for NSW

Disused railway stations in Sydney
Railway stations in Australia opened in 1885
Railway stations closed in 2020
Camellia, New South Wales
2020 disestablishments in Australia